The 1906–07 NYU Violets men's basketball team represented New York University during the 1906–07 collegiate men's basketball season. The team finished with an overall record of 5–2.

Schedule

|-

References

NYU Violets men's basketball seasons
NYU
NYU
NYU